Muromtsevsky District is an administrative and municipal district (raion), one of the thirty-two in Omsk Oblast, Russia. It is located in the east of the oblast. Its administrative center is the urban locality (a work settlement) of Muromtsevo. Population: 23,795 (2010 Census);  The population of Muromtsevo accounts for 45.3% of the district's total population.

References

Notes

Sources

Districts of Omsk Oblast